Miss Belgium 2017 was the 49th edition of the Miss Belgium held on January 14, 2017 at the Plopsaland Theater in  De Panne, Belgium.

The winner, Romanie Schotte  from West Flanders, was crowned by the outgoing title holder, Lenty Frans, Miss Belgium 2016. 

Romanie Schotte represented Belgium at Miss World 2017. The first runner up, Liesbeth Claus entered Miss Universe 2017.

Official contestants
30 candidates competed for the title:

Judges 
The Miss Belgium 2017 final judges were:

Darline Devos -  President of Committee Miss Belgium
Katherine Kelly Lang - American actress known for her role as Brooke Logan in The Bold and the Beautiful
Annelies Törös - Miss Belgium 2015
Laura Beyne - Miss Belgium 2012
Yfke Sturm - Dutch model
Mireia Lalaguna - Miss World 2015 from Spain
Philip Cracco - Belgian owner of the watch brand Rodania
Olivier Laurent - Belgian imitator and humorist

Contestant notes 
Elisa Arnould, Miss Luxembourg, had finished 1st runner-up of Miss Luxembourg. The holder of this title, Marine Toussaint, was dismissed after the discovery of a live on Facebook in which she would have launched with a friend offensive remarks against several candidates. The result was that it was dethroned by the Miss Belgium Committee. His title was transferred to his first dauphine, Elisa Arnould.
Rosmine Bahizi, second runner-up of Miss Antwerp, is of Congolese descent.
Sofia Bouhadjar, Crown Card de Miss Hainaut, is of Italian and Algerian descent.
Noémie Depré, Miss Hainaut, is of Italian descent.
Myriam Sahili, Miss Brussels, has dual citizenships Moroccan and Belgian.
Selin Yürük, first runner-up of Miss Brussels, is of Turkish descent.

Crossovers 
Contestants who previously competed at other national beauty pageants:

Miss Italia Charleroi
2014: : Noémie Depré (Winner)

Miss Italia Belgio 
2014: : Noémie Depré (Winner)

Miss Elegantie
2016: : Maïté Rivera Armayones (Winner)

Miss Elegance Belgium
2016: : Selin Yürük (Top 5)

Miss Belgium Limbourg International
2014: : Leentje Jorissen (Winner)

Contestants who previously competed or will be competing at international beauty pageants:

Miss World
2017: : Romanie Schotte

Miss Universe
2017: : Liesbeth Claus

Miss Europe Continental
2015: : Noémie Depré (Top 5 and Miss Modarea)

Miss Teen International
2017: : Raphaëlla Deuringer

References

External links

Miss Belgium
2017 beauty pageants
2017 in Belgium